El Yeso is a reservoir located in the Andes, in the Santiago Metropolitan Region, Chile. It was formed by the damming of the Yeso River, part of the Maipo river basin. The reservoir has a capacity of 250,000,000 m³ and was completed in 1964.

El Yeso reservoir, along with the nearby Laguna Negra, is a major source of drinking water for Santiago.

Its water has a turquoise hue and is suitable for fishing and windsurfing.

References

Lakes of Santiago Metropolitan Region
Principal Cordillera
El Yeso